Lake Virmayarvi is a small ( long) lake straddling the border between Finland (Ilomantsi municipality) and Russia (Suoyarvsky District, Republic of Karelia). The easternmost point of Finland and of the Schengen Area and of the continental European Union is located on an island in the lake.

Virmayarvi
LVirmayarvi
Finland–Russia border
Virmayarvi
Landforms of North Karelia
Lakes of Ilomantsi